Allanridge is a gold mining town in the Lejweleputswa District Municipality of the Free State province in South Africa. It is the main centre of the Loraine Gold Mining Company and is dominated by the tall headgear and complex reduction works that processes thousands of tons of gold-bearing ore every month.

Allanridge established as a settlement in the Free State goldfields in 1947 and was named after Allan Roberts whose borehole's proximity to the gold bearing reef was the precursor to the mining in the area. The town layout was designed by town planner William Backhouse, who also planned Welkom. It became a municipality on 21 December 1956 but this changed on the 5 December 2000 when it was incorporated into the Matjhabeng Local Municipality with the city of Welkom and the towns of Hennenman, Odendaalsrus, Ventersburg and Virginia.

The Phathakahle township is 3 km outside of Allanridge. It was established during the apartheid era to house the mine workers of the Loraine Gold Mining Company.
It also have three primary Schools (S.A Mokhothu, Dihwai and Tshireletso ) and two high schools {LA wesi and Mosala}.The first part of Nyakallong was (skomplas)

References

Populated places in the Matjhabeng Local Municipality
Populated places established in 1947
Mining communities in South Africa
1947 establishments in South Africa